Mongolia first competed at the Summer Paralympic Games in 2000, and has competed in every edition of the Summer Paralympics since then. The country first participated at the Winter Paralympic Games in 2006.

Mongolia's first Paralympic medal came in 2008, when Dambadondogiin Baatarjav took gold in the men's archery, in the recurve standing event.

List of medalists

See also
 Mongolia at the Olympics

References